Viswanadan Kalidas (born 12 February 1972) is a Malaysian cricket umpire. He is a member of the Development Panel of ICC Umpires, and was the first Malaysian umpire to be appointed to the ICC's Development Panel.

He stood in his first Twenty20 International (T20I) match, between Papua New Guinea and the Philippines in the Regional Finals of the 2018–19 ICC T20 World Cup East Asia-Pacific Qualifier tournament on 22 March 2019.

See also
 List of Twenty20 International cricket umpires

References

External links
 

1972 births
Living people
Malaysian Twenty20 International cricket umpires
Place of birth missing (living people)
People from Ipoh